Campanella (plural campanelle) is Italian for 'little bell', and may refer to:

Campanella (surname)
Campanella (fungus), a genus in family Marasmiaceae
The third movement of Violin Concerto No. 2 by Paganini
La Campanella, a piano étude by Franz Liszt

See also
 Campanelle, a type of pasta shaped like a small bell or flower
 Campanile (disambiguation)
Campanula, a genus of plant in family Campanulaceae
Roy Campanella, an American baseball player
 Campanella is one of two main characters in Kenji Miyazawa's novel, Night on the Galactic Railroad
Shukufuku no Campanella, a visual novel by Windmill
Wednesday Campanella, a Japanese music group